Best Kept Secrets with Lele Pons is a weekly podcast produced by Shots Studios and exclusively distributed by Spotify. Hosted by American YouTuber Lele Pons, the podcast invites anonymous callers to share deeply personal and intimate secrets that they have kept from family and friends. The podcast debuted on August 19, 2020.

Background 

In November 2019, The Hollywood Reporter announced that Pons inked an exclusive deal with Spotify to create an original podcast. Pons was one of a handful of high-profile celebrities and figures—including former President Barack Obama, former First Lady Michelle Obama, and actors Jordan Peele and Mark Wahlberg—to reach agreements with the Swedish streaming giant as a part of Spotify's quest to produce an impressive slate of podcasts to compete with other streaming services.

Pons joined actor and filmmaker Paul Feig and Spotify's Chief Content Officer Dawn Ostroff at CES in January 2020. As reported by Variety, Pons told attendees "I haven't been this excited since I did my first YouTube video" in regards to the podcast.

On August 12, 2020, Pons released a 58-second introductory snippet, providing insight into the format, notably that each episode would feature two callers joining her. The Hollywood Reporter noted that Pons serves as a "sounding board" for her guests.

The first episode—titled "Sex Clubs & Evil Stepmoms"—debuted on August 19, 2020.

Best Kept Secrets with Lele Pons is produced by Shots Studios, the creative studio that also manages Pons.

Episodes 

A total of 50 episodes were released as of January 2022, with the last episode released on July 28, 2021.

References 

Audio podcasts
2020 podcast debuts